The Red and the Black is a 1985 Croatian film directed by Miroslav Mikuljan, starring Bekim Fehmiu, Milan Štrljić, Olivera Ježina, and Radko Polič. The film is about the 1921 Labin Republic in Istria, during the world's first anti-fascist uprising.

References

Sources
 Crveni i crni

External links
 

1985 films
Croatian romantic drama films
1980s Croatian-language films
Yugoslav romantic drama films
Films set in 1921
Films set in the 1920s